The following lists events in the year 2021 in Belize.

Incumbents

 Monarch: Elizabeth II, Queen of Belize
 Prime Minister: Johnny Briceño
 Governor-General: Sir Colville Young (to 30 April 2021), Stuart Leslie (acting from 1 to 27 May 2021), Froyla Tzalam (since 27 May 2021)
 Chief Justice of Belize: Michelle Arana (acting since 20 March 2020)

Events

Ongoing — COVID-19 pandemic in Belize
1 January – 2021 New Year Honours
15 January – George Cadle Price Day, honours the 1st Prime Minister (1989-1993).
12 June – Marcelo Ebrard, Mexican Foreign Minister, announced on May 12, 2021, that Mexico will donate 400,000 doses of Oxford–AstraZeneca COVID-19 vaccine to Bolivia, Belize, and Paraguay.
20 November — Destiny Wagner wins Miss Earth 2021, this is the first time that Belize won in one of the most prestigious Big Four international beauty pageants.

Scheduled

24 May – Commonwealth Day.
1 August – Emancipation Day, Starting 2021, Belize joins other Caribbean nations in the observance of Emancipation Day to commemorate the emancipation of enslaved people in 1843.
10–21 September — September Celebrations, including Battle of St. George's Caye Day (1798) and Independence Day (1981).

Deaths

1 January – Dame Elmira Minita Gordon, politician, Governor-General (1981 to 1993).

See also

COVID-19 pandemic in North America
2021 Atlantic hurricane season

References

 
2020s in Belize
Years of the 21st century in Belize
Belize
Belize